Contardo Ferrini (5 April 1859 – 17 October 1902) was a noted Italian jurist and legal scholar. He was also a fervent Roman Catholic, who lived a devout life of prayer and service to the poor. He has been beatified by the Catholic Church.

Life
He was born on 5 April 1859 in Milan, Italy, to Rinaldo Ferrini and Luigia Buccellati. He was baptized at the same baptismal font where Frédéric Ozanam, also a native of Milan, had been baptized 46 years prior. After receiving his First Holy Communion at the age of twelve, he joined the Confraternity of the Blessed Sacrament.

Rinaldo Ferrini, a professor of mathematics and science, taught his son at an early age. Contardo learned to speak several languages. His love for the Catholic faith caused friends to nickname him "Saint Aloysius" (after Aloysius Gonzaga). He entered the University of Pavia at age seventeen and, two years later, he was appointed Dean of Students. At age twenty-one he became a doctor of the law at the university. His doctoral thesis, which related Penal Law to Homeric poetry, was the basis of his being awarded a scholarship to the University of Berlin, where he specialized in Roman-Byzantine law, a field in which he became internationally recognized as an expert.

During Ferrini's stay in Berlin, he wrote of his excitement at receiving the Sacrament of Penance for the first time in a foreign land. The experience brought home to him, he wrote, the universality of the Roman Catholic Church.

Upon his return to Italy, Ferrini was a lecturer in the universities at Messina, Modena, and Pavia. He received his first professorship at the young age of twenty-six. Contardo attempted to discern his vocation whether as a secular priest, a member of a religious order, or as a married person. Ultimately, he fulfilled his vocation as an unmarried layperson. He vowed himself to God, became a member of the Third Order of St. Francis in 1886, and was also a member of the Saint Vincent de Paul Society, to which he had been introduced by his father, a member of the Society.

As a faculty member at University of Pavia, Ferrini was considered an expert in Roman Law. Over the course of his career he published books, articles and reviews. He taught for a time at the University of Paris. He later became a canon lawyer in addition to being a civil lawyer.

An unconfirmed anecdote about Ferrini is that he was asked to attend a dinner party and, once there, found it tedious. His resort was to invite all the guests to join him in praying the rosary.

In 1900, Ferrini developed a heart lesion. In autumn 1902, in order to rest, he went to his country home in the village of Suna, Novara, (now part of the commune of Verbania, Province of Verbano-Cusio-Ossola), on the shores of Lake Maggiore. While there, he became ill with typhus. He died at age forty-three on 17 October 1902. Residents of Suna immediately declared him a saint. His colleagues at the University of Pavia wrote letters in which he was described as a saint.

Veneration
In 1909 Pope Pius X authorized Cardinal Andrea Carlo Ferrari, the Archbishop of Milan, to open a process to promote Ferrini's canonization. He was subsequently declared Venerable by Pope Pius XI and he was beatified by Pope Pius XII on 13 April 1947. His body is venerated in a chapel of Milan's Catholic University.

Ferrini is the patron saint of universities, professors and Homeric scholarship.

Works

See also

Third Order of St. Francis

Notes

1859 births
1902 deaths
Writers from Milan
Homeric scholars
Italian legal scholars
Italian Byzantinists
19th-century Italian jurists
20th-century Italian jurists
Canon law jurists
Members of the Third Order of Saint Francis
Academic staff of the University of Pavia
Academic staff of the University of Paris
Deaths from typhus
Infectious disease deaths in Piedmont
Beatifications by Pope Pius XII
Italian beatified people
Franciscan beatified people
19th-century venerated Christians
20th-century venerated Christians
Academic staff of the University of Messina
University of Pavia alumni
Humboldt University of Berlin alumni
20th-century Italian historians
19th-century Italian historians